Balnamore is a small village in County Antrim, Northern Ireland. It is within the townland of Ballynacree-Skein and lies 3 km west of Ballymoney. It is part Causeway Coast and Glens District Council. Historically it was known as Ballinamore.

Transport
The village has good road links to Ballymoney and Coleraine and adequate public transport connections by bus to these two towns.

Education
Balnamore Primary School

Demography
Balnamore had a population of 900 people (342 households) in the 2011 Census.

2001 Census
Balnamore is classified as a Small Village by the NI Statistics and Research Agency (NISRA) (i.e. with population between 500 and 1,000 people). On Census day (29 April 2001) there were 661 people living in Balnamore. Of these:
22.4% were aged under 16 years and 16.5% were aged 60 and over
51.9% of the population were male and 48.1% were female
5.6% were from a Catholic background and 90.9% were from a Protestant background
3.3% of people aged 16–74 were unemployed

See also
List of towns and villages in Northern Ireland

References

Villages in County Antrim